Die Niemandsrose (in English The No-One's-Rose) is a 1963 German-language poetry collection by Paul Celan.

References

1963 poetry books
Poetry by Paul Celan
German poetry collections
S. Fischer Verlag books